Claude Bergeaud (born 30 April 1960 in Artigat, Ariège, France) is a French basketball coach. From 2008 to 2010, he was the director general of the club Pau-Orthez.

Biography

Clubs
 1996 - end of 1997 :  Pau-Orthez (Pro A) : assistant coach
 end of 1997 - 2002 :  Pau-Orthez (Pro A)
 2005 - 2006 :  ASVEL Lyon-Villeurbanne (Pro A)

National team
 End of 2003 - end of 2007 :  France national basketball team

Honours

National team
 World Championships
 5th place in 2006 World Championships in Japan
 European Championships
  Bronze medal at 2005 European Basketball Championships in Belgrade
 8th in 2007 European Championships in Spain

Clubs
With Pau-Orthez, he won :
 French Championships in 1998, 1999, 2001
 Coupe de France in 2002
 Pro A Coach of the Year 1999
 Peigne d'or 1977

References

See also 

French basketball coaches
1960 births
Living people
ASVEL Basket coaches